Canadian royal symbols are the visual and auditory identifiers of the Canadian monarchy, including the viceroys, in the country's federal and provincial jurisdictions. These may specifically distinguish organizations that derive their authority from the Crown (such as parliament or police forces), establishments with royal associations, or merely be ways of expressing loyal or patriotic sentiment.

Most royal symbols in Canada are based on inherited predecessors from France, England, and Scotland, the evidence of which is still visible today, though, over time, adaptations have been made to include uniquely Canadian elements. Some representations were discarded during and after the 1970s, within an evolving Canadian identity, while others were created over the same time and continue to be up to the present. Today, symbols of the monarchy can be seen in military badges, provincial and national coats of arms, royal prefixes, monuments, and eponymous names of geographical locations and structures.

Purpose

The use of royal symbols developed from the first royal emblems and images of French, English, Scottish, and, later, British monarchs that were brought by colonists to New France and British North America to represent the authority of the sovereign back in Europe. The first verifiable use of a royal symbol in Canada was when Jacques Cartier raised the Royal Arms of France on the Gaspé Peninsula in 1534. Since then, some icons were created for use uniquely in the Canadas—mostly coats of arms. But, only after the First World War did growing Canadian nationalism lead to changes in the appearance and meaning to Canadians of royal symbols. Since Canada gained full legislative independence from the United Kingdom in 1931, images of the reigning monarch have been employed to signify either Canada's membership in the Commonwealth of Nations, the Crown's authority, loyalty to Canada, or Canada's full statehood.

Images
The main symbol of the monarchy is the sovereign him or herself, being described as "the personal expression of the Crown in Canada" and the personification of the Canadian state. Thus, the image of the sovereign acts as an indication of that individual's authority and therefore appears on objects created by order of the Crown-in-Council, such as coins, postage stamps, and the Great Seal of Canada. Through the 1800s, effigies and pictures of the monarch—Queen Victoria, especially—came to be symbolic of the wider British Empire, to which Canada belonged. As with other royal symbols, though, the general domestic meaning of the sovereign's portrait altered through the 20th century. The Royal Cypher is also regarded as a personal logo of the monarch, generally consisting of at least his or her initials. In Canada, the cypher has come to be indicative of the country's full sovereignty.

Coinage and postage

Coins were one of the first objects to bear the image of the reigning sovereign in what is today Canada. After 1640, French colonists employed the Louis d'or ("gold Louis", which first bore the effigy of King Louis XIII and then all subsequent French monarchs) until the transfer of New France to the British in 1763. After, British sovereigns and coppers were used, sometimes long after the end of the reign of the monarch appearing on the coin. As a result of decimalisation, the Province of Canada replaced the Canadian pound with the dollar in 1858, minting new coins whose obverse side featured an effigy of Queen Victoria; a trend that continued with the first coins issued in Canada after confederation. Since its establishment in 1908, coins minted by the Royal Canadian Mint featured an effigy of the reigning monarch. 

The effigies used on Canadian coins remained consistent with the effigies used in other Commonwealth realms until 1990, when the Royal Canadian Mint choose to use an effigy of the Queen designed by Dora de Pédery-Hunt. Pédery-Hunt was the first Canadian to sculpt an effigy of Elizabeth II on coinage. The effigy of Queen Elizabeth II on Canadian coins minted since 2003 was rendered by Susanna Blunt.

Images of the reigning monarch and his or her family have also traditionally been printed on Canadian postage stamps since 1851, when Queen Victoria and her consort, Prince Albert, were shown on 12- and 6-pence stamps, respectively, for mail in the Province of Canada. Stamps previously issued in other British North American colonies showed images of crowns and, into the late 1800s, bore some variation of the Queen's cypher. Starting in 1939, when she was still Princess Elizabeth of York, Queen Elizabeth II was depicted in 59 successive stamp designs in Canada, continuing on to the Queen Elizabeth II definitive stamps released in the 2000s.

Artworks

The monarchs of Canada have been portrayed by Canadian and European artists in paint, sculpture, and photography. Formal likenesses of the monarch are often found inside or outside government buildings, military installations, many schools, and Canada's high commissions and embassies abroad, as well as in parks and other public places. A full collection of portraits of sovereigns of Canada and its predecessor territories going back to King Francis I was amassed by Senator Serge Joyal and are on display in the Senate foyer and Salon de la Francophonie in the parliament buildings' Centre Block.

An official painted portrait of Queen Elizabeth II was created in 1976, and another by Scarborough, Ontario, artist Phil Richards was completed in 2012 mark the monarch's Diamond Jubilee. The latter image depicts Elizabeth wearing her insignia as Sovereign of the Order of Canada and Order of Military Merit and standing in Rideau Hall beside a desk upon which is a copy of the Constitution Act, 1867 (granted royal assent by Queen Victoria and patriated by Queen Elizabeth), and a vase embossed with the Canadian Diamond Jubilee emblem; behind the Queen is the Canadian national flag and George Hayter's 1837 state portrait of Victoria. The creation of this portrait is the subject of a National Film Board of Canada (NFB) documentary directed by Hubert Davis, which was released in fall 2012 as part of the NFB's Queen's Diamond Jubilee Collector's Edition. The painting was on 25 June installed in the ballroom at Rideau Hall.

Elizabeth II was also the subject of Canadian painters, including Hilton Hassell, who depicted Princess Elizabeth square dancing at Rideau Hall in 1951, and Jean Paul Lemieux, whose 1979 work affectionate memory images combines "the familiar and the constitutional" by portraying the Queen and the Duke of Edinburgh in a meadow in front of the Canadian parliament buildings. Charles Pachter created the painting The Queen on a Moose, which depicts exactly what the title describes and has become a Canadian cultural image. Pachter subsequently made similar pieces showing the Queen's son, Prince Charles (later King Charles III) and his wife, Camilla, standing alongside a moose, and Charles's son, Prince William, and his wife, Catherine, with Canadian wildlife, such as a moose and a squirrel.

More formal and enduring are the sculptures of some of Canada's monarchs, such as Louis-Philippe Hébert's bronze statue of Queen Victoria that was in 1901 unveiled on Parliament Hill in Ottawa. Jack Harmon of British Columbia created in 1992 the equestrian statue of Queen Elizabeth II that also stands on Parliament Hill, and sculptor Susan Velder fashioned in June 2003 another such statue for the grounds of the Saskatchewan Legislative Building.

Queen Elizabeth II posed for a number of Canada's prominent photographers, the first being Yousuf Karsh, who made a formal portrait of Elizabeth when she was a 17-year-old princess and, later, took a series of official pictures of the princess, in formal and informal poses, just months before she acceded to the throne. Karsh was commissioned on two subsequent occasions to create series of pictures of the Queen and the Duke of Edinburgh, once prior to Elizabeth's 1967 tour of Canada for the centenary of Canada's confederation, when he photographed the royal couple at Buckingham Palace, and again in 1984, creating a set of portraits that included a shot of the Queen with her corgi, Shadow. Prior to her second tour of Canada as queen in 1959, Elizabeth requested that a Canadian photographer take her pre-tour pictures and Donald McKeague of Toronto was selected. Then, in 1973, Onnig Cavoukian, also from Toronto, made a photographic portrait that was dubbed "The Citizen Queen" because of the informal way in which Elizabeth was depicted. Rideau Hall photographer John Evans captured the sovereign on film in 1977, during her Silver Jubilee stay in Ottawa; Evans portrayed the Queen following her return from opening parliament. More recently, photographic portraits of Queen Elizabeth II were made in 2002, as part of her Golden Jubilee celebrations, and in 2005, when she marked the centenaries of Alberta and Saskatchewan.

Clothing and jewellery

In the role of the state personified, the monarch has worn clothing symbolic of the country and his or her distinct role in it. For instance, the gown worn by Queen Elizabeth II at both her coronation in London and the opening of the Canadian parliament in 1957 was decorated with the floral emblems of her realms, including maple leaves for Canada. During the same 1957 visit to Ottawa, the Queen also wore to a banquet held at Rideau Hall the Maple-Leaf-of-Canada dress; it was a pale green satin gown, edged with a garland consisting of deep green velvet maple leaves appliquéd with crystals and emeralds. Afterwards, the dress was donated to the Crown Collection and is now held at the Canadian Museum of History. Similarly, for a dinner held in July 2010 in Toronto, Elizabeth wore a white gown with silver maple leaves appliquéd on the right sleeve and shoulder. Occasionally, the Queen will wear clothing designed with Aboriginal motifs and/or materials made by some of Canada's First Nations peoples. For the opening of parliament in 1977, the Queen wore a gown with gold fringes that was suggestive of an aboriginal princess and, in 2010, wore in Nova Scotia a coat trimmed with beads made by women of the Mi'kmaq nation.

The monarch also owns various jewellery pieces that are distinctively Canadian, such as two maple leaf brooches, one made from pink and yellow precious gems and the other from diamonds. The diamond maple leaf brooch was originally owned by Queen Elizabeth, the Queen Mother, and was first worn by the Queen on her 1951 tour of Canada, when she was still Princess Elizabeth. She has lent it to the Duchess of Cornwall (now the Queen Consort) and the Duchess of Cambridge (now the Princess of Wales) for their tours of Canada.

To mark Queen Elizabeth II's 65th year as Queen of Canada and the 150th anniversary of Canadian Confederation, she was at Canada House presented by Governor General David Johnston with the Sapphire Jubilee Snowflake Brooch. Designed as a companion to the diamond maple leaf brooch, the piece was made by Hillberg and Berk of Saskatchewan and consists of sapphires from a cache found in 2002 on Baffin Island by brothers Seemeega and Nowdluk Aqpik. The Saskatchewan Tourmaline Brooch was also made by Hillberg and Berk and gifted to the Queen in 2013 by the Lieutenant Governor of Saskatchewan Vaughn Solomon Schofield. It has an asymmetrical geometric floral design and is made of white gold set with Madagascar tourmalines, diamonds, and a single freshwater pearl. The government of the Northwest Territories had the Polar Bear Brooch made for the then-Duchess of Cambridge, and matching cufflinks for the then-Duke of Cambridge, in 2011. Created by Harry Winston, the brooch features  of pavé-set diamonds in platinum; 302 diamonds in total, all mined at the local Diavik Diamond Mine. The cufflinks consist of 390 diamonds, weighing  total.

Crown

A crown is a heraldic device that is prevalent across Canada, being incorporated into a multitude of other emblems and insignia. On the most basic level, the crown itself is a visual reminder of the monarchy, its central place as the fuse between all branches of government, and its embodiment of the continuity of the state. As Canada is a constitutional monarchy with responsible government, the crown can also symbolise "the sovereignty (or authority) of the people." 

It can be found on, amongst others, the Royal Cypher; the Royal Arms of Canada; some of the provincial and territorial coats of arms; the badges of the Royal Canadian Mounted Police; and those of the Canadian Forces, the Canadian Coast Guard, and several other badges of federal departments. A crown may also be found atop signs in Ontario for the King's Highways and the Queen Elizabeth Way. A crown is also present on various Canadian decorations and medals, as well as the insignia for all the country's orders, reflecting the monarch's place as the fount of honour. The crown may exist on a medallion as a part of the Royal Cypher and/or on the sovereign's head in effigy, though it can also be placed atop the medal of badge of an order. Use of the royal crowns in any design requires the consent of the monarch; sought through the office of the governor general.

A two-dimensional representation of St. Edward's Crown has been used in a variety of designs since the 1950s; as directed by Queen Elizabeth II when she acceded to the throne. Prior to the adoption of St. Edward's Crown, a two-dimensional representation of the Tudor Crown was used throughout a number of designs to represent royal authority. The physical St Edward's Crown remains the property of the Queen in Right of the United Kingdom; although its two-dimensional representation has been adopted for use to represent royal authority in various Commonwealth realms, including Canada.

Snowflake Diadem

In the 21st century, several Canadian decorations and medals were introduced that featured a uniquely Canadian diadem, the Snowflake Diadem, on the head of Queen Elizabeth II's effigy. Designed, and approved by the Queen in 2008, the diadem is made up of alternating snowflakes and maple leaves. However, the diadem does not physically exist; and is considered to be a "heraldic invention" for the purposes of "nationalizing the sovereign," and to symbolize her status as the Queen of Canada. 

Canadian decorations and medals have used the Snowflake Diadem on effigies, including the Operational Service Medal, Polar Medal, Sacrifice Medal, and the Sovereign's Medal for Volunteers. The diadem is also depicted in the Diamond Jubilee Window in the Canadian Senate foyer.

A variation of the Snowflake Diadem, composed of only snowflakes instead of alternating snowflakes and maple leaves, is also used as a heraldic crown for the coat of arms of Canadian institutions like the Tax Court of Canada. Like the original Snowflake Diadem design, the snowflake-only design serves as a reference to Canada being a northern realm.

Mace

In the federal and provincial parliaments, maces represent the authority of the monarch in the legislature. At the apex of each mace is a crown, substituting for the deadly bulge of the prehistoric club and the spiked ball of the medieval battle mace. Members of Parliament, the Legislative Assembly, or National Assembly cannot pass bills until the relevant mace has been placed before the speaker of the chamber. This acknowledges that parliament's power to legislate stems from the Crown.

Flags

Similar to coats of arms, flags are utilized to represent royal authority and specific royal and viceroyal offices. The standards of the kings of France were the first royal flags to be used in what is now Canada, a flag bearing the arms of King Louis XIV being used as the symbol of New France after the colony was in 1663 reformed as a royal province of France. Canadian royal standard of Queen Elizabeth II was a heraldic banner that bore the shield of the monarch's Canadian arms defaced with her personal device—a crowned E in a circle of roses—and was used by the Queen whenever in Canada or acting on behalf of the country abroad, the flag being flown from any building or vehicle occupied by the monarch. This flag was created in 1961 to replace the Royal Standard of the United Kingdom, which had been previously used by the Canadian monarch in Canada and overseas.

The flag of the governor general displays the crest of the Canadian royal arms—a crowned lion holding a maple leaf—and is used in a fashion akin to the sovereign's flag. Each of the provincial viceroys also has a representative flag, most being a blue field on which is displayed the shield of the province's arms surmounted by a crown. William, Prince of Wales; and Anne, Princess Royal also each have their own personal Canadian standards, which follow in precedence that of the viceroy of the relevant jurisdiction.

The Union Flag was formerly used as a national flag of Canada, prior to the adoption of the Maple Leaf flag in 1965. Following the adoption of the Maple Leaf flag, the Union Flag was retained as an official flag of Canada and renamed the Royal Union Flag by parliamentary resolution, intended as a marker of Canada's loyalty to the Crown and membership in the Commonwealth of Nations. Both it and the standard of royal France have a prominent place in the Royal Arms of Canada.

Verbal and musical symbols
Music and song are used in various ways as reminders and identifiers of the sovereign or viceroys. By tradition, the tune "God Save the King" (or "God Save the Queen" in the reign of a female monarch) was heard in the Canadian colonies since the late 18th century and continued to be played after Confederation in 1867. In 1980, "O Canada" was adopted as the national anthem and "God Save the Queen" became, by convention, the Royal Anthem, for use as a musical salute to the sovereign in person or as a display of loyalty in any circumstance. It was also incorporated into the Canadian Royal Salute, which is used upon the arrival of the governor general or a lieutenant governor and consists of the first six bars of the Royal Anthem followed by the first and last four bars of "O Canada".

At official functions, regardless of whether or not the monarch is personally present, the Loyal Toast may be recited; it consists of a toast to the health of the sovereign and is generally led by the host of or guest of honour at a ceremony, aside from the monarch him or herself. In English, the toast is: "Ladies and Gentlemen, the King of Canada," and in French: "" In the mess of regiments in which the monarch holds an honorary appointment, the toast is modified slightly to be read as: "Ladies and Gentlemen, the King of Canada, our Colonel-in-Chief," and in French: "" Where a band is present, the Royal Anthem is played following the recital of the Loyal Toast.

The monarch also acts as the locus of fealty in the Oath of Allegiance, which also forms a part of the Oath of Citizenship. This giving of allegiance to the sovereign has been described as the expression of "a solemn intention to adhere to the symbolic keystone of the Canadian Constitution as it has been and is, thus pledging an acceptance of the whole of our constitution and national life."

The word royal itself is frequently used as a prefix to the name of an organization that has gained the monarch's favour or patronage. The granting of this distinction falls within the royal prerogative and thus is conferred by the monarch through the office of his or her viceroy, with input from the Ceremonial and Canadian Symbols Promotion Programme within the Department of Canadian Heritage on whether or not the institution meets the designated criteria: The organization must have been in existence for at least 25 years, be financially secure, and be non-profit, amongst others. Any organization that has been so honoured may receive appropriate royal insignia when petitioning the Canadian Heraldic Authority for a grant of armorial bearings or other emblem.

Similarly, crown is commonly used in language related to governance or law enforcement. Terms include Crown ward, Crown land, Crown-held property, Crown corporations, Crown copyright, and the Crown can refer to the government's lawyers in courts of law. Crown is used as the general term expressing the legal personality of the executive of government.

Calendar dates

Certain dates are of royal significance in Canada. Victoria Day has been since 1834 a holiday to mark the birthday of Queen Victoria. After 1957, the same date was designated as the reigning monarch's official birthday. At military sites, on navy vessels, and on government property, flags will also be flown to mark specific royal occasions, including Accession Day (8 September), the actual birthday of the monarch (14 November), the official birthday of the monarch (Monday before 25 May), and the birthday of the royal consort (17 July).

Each year since 1932, the monarch has delivered the Royal Christmas Message to the British Commonwealth (later the Commonwealth of Nations); originally broadcast on the British Broadcasting Corporation Empire Service, it is today shown in Canada on the Canadian Broadcasting Corporation television and radio. Except for being read at observances by loyal societies, the monarch's Commonwealth Day (second Monday in March) message is ignored by the media in Canada.

Geographic names
There are hundreds of places named for Canadian monarchs and members of the Royal Family all across Canada. No individual has been more honoured than Queen Victoria in the names of Canada's public buildings, streets, populated places, and physical features. The trend for naming places after the sovereign began after the Queen granted John Ross permission to name a small bay in the Northwest Passage after her. Following this, explorers and mapmakers gave the name Victoria to a multitude of geographical features all over the Canadian map; her name appears more than 300 times. Also, amongst the 280 postal divisions in Canada, more than half have at least one thoroughfare identified by the name Victoria.

See also

 National symbols of Canada
 Canadian Red Ensign
 Regional tartans of Canada
 Royal Swans
 The Queen's Beasts

Notes

References

Bibliography

External links
 Royal Symbols and Titles - Government of Canada

Monarchy in Canada
National symbols of Canada